Who Do You Think You Are? is an Irish genealogy documentary series that first aired on RTÉ One in 2008. It is made by the production company Mint. In each episode, a celebrity goes on a journey to trace his or her lineage through a family tree. The series is based on the original version of the franchise, broadcast by the BBC in the United Kingdom. A third series started on 9 September 2018 with six new episodes.

Notable discoveries
In the first episode, RTÉ news reporter Charlie Bird discovered his great-great-grandfather had been involved in the Battle of the Nile (1798) and served under Admiral Nelson himself, whilst Bird also discovered that his grandfather was a bigamist.

In the fifth episode, RTÉ presenter Pamela Flood travelled through "19th-century Dublin, taking in red light districts, millionaire solicitors, pawnbrokers, contested wills, illegitimate children and murder". She met historian David Nolan, who has written a history of Corballis House, where her granny was sent to stay; they subsequently discovered she was born out of wedlock.

In the first episode of the second series Ryan Tubridy discovered he was a descendant of Edward III. Geneticist Adam Rutherford criticised the series for misleading its viewers into thinking that such descent was rare, noting that "almost every Briton" was descended from Edward III.

List of episodes

First series

Second series

Third series

Response
The first series was criticised for its attempts to mimic the original BBC version. The Irish Independent remarked that: "Our [the Irish nation] pool of talent is so small that the entire country knows exactly what Charlie Bird's lifestyle and personal circumstances are. He is an RTÉ "personality", to be wheeled out in each and every situation ... ad nauseam. He is meant to be a working journalist, not a personality star. It muddies the waters of credibility when supposedly serious journalists become personality acts".

Just before the first episode was broadcast, the Evening Herald ironically compared RTÉ's "awkwardly titled" Where Was Your Family During the Famine? (also broadcast in 2008), in which celebrities traced their family histories back to the darkest period in Ireland's history, to the BBC version.

Mention was also made of the high proportion of RTÉ employees involved in the series (Bird is a news reporter, Duffy a radio broadcaster, Flood a television presenter and Martin appears frequently on RTÉ), with a suggestion that the series ought to be renamed Who Do RTÉ Personalities Think They Are?

References

External links
 Official website (archive link)

2008 Irish television series debuts
2009 Irish television series endings
Irish documentary television series
Irish genealogy
Irish history television shows
Irish television series based on British television series
RTÉ original programming
Television series about family history